New Mexico is a state located in the Western United States. New Mexico has several census-designated places (CDPs) which are unincorporated communities lacking elected municipal officers and boundaries with legal status.

List of census-designated places

Former census-designated places

Notes

See also
List of cities in the United States

Populated places in New Mexico
New Mexico
Settlements
 List